Climates is a 2006 Turkish drama film directed by Nuri Bilge Ceylan. The film charts the deteriorating relationship between a professional Istanbul couple, İsa and Bahar, played by Ceylan and his wife Ebru Ceylan. It was Ceylan's first film shot on High-definition video. The title of the film comes from André Maurois's novel Climats.

Plot
The film starts on a summer holiday in Kaş, where the couple are barely talking. İsa is taking pictures of ancient monuments for a perpetually unfinished thesis for the university class he teaches; Bahar watches. At the beach she falls asleep and dreams that he is smothering her in sand. After rehearsing his speech while Bahar is swimming, Isa tells her that he wants to break up. While riding back to the city on a motorbike she suddenly covers his eyes with her hands, which causes the bike to crash, although both of them avoid serious injury. The couple go their separate ways and Bahar tells him not to call.

As fall follows summer, back in Istanbul, İsa makes contact again with a woman, Serap, with whom he cheated on Bahar before and who is in a relationship with an acquaintance of his. Winter arrives and İsa dreams of a holiday in the sun, but instead flies to Ağrı, the snowy eastern province of Turkey, where Bahar is working as an art director filming a TV series on location. He tries to win her back, but she rejects his advances. Later, she comes to his hotel room and stays overnight, but in the morning he flies off alone.

Cast
 Ebru Ceylan as Bahar
 Nuri Bilge Ceylan as İsa
 Nazan Kırılmış as Serap
 Mehmet Eryılmaz as Mehmet
 Arif Aşçı as Arif
 Can Özbatur as Güven

Technique
The film features long takes of head shots, and poetic landscapes. The dialogue has long silences during which casual sounds are highlighted, such as the sound of a woman drawing on a cigarette.

Reception
Climates has received positive reviews from critics. On Rotten Tomatoes, the film has a rating of 73%, based on 66 reviews, with an average rating of 6.9/10. The site's critical consensus reads, "Aesthetically sound and solidly acted, but will nonetheless ring hollow for some viewers." On Metacritic, the film has a score of 72 out of 100, based on 25 critics, indicating "generally favorable reviews".

The film was nominated for the Golden Palm at the 2006 Cannes Film Festival, and won the FIPRESCI Award there. Critic Michael Phillips named Climates the best film of 2006 and, later, the third greatest movie of the decade.

References

External links
 Official website
 
 Web site with trailer

2006 drama films
2006 films
Films directed by Nuri Bilge Ceylan
Films set in Turkey
2000s Turkish-language films
Turkish drama films
Films set on beaches